Coptotriche japoniella is a moth of the family Tischeriidae that is endemic to Japan.

The larvae feed on Eurya japonica and Eurya emarginata. They mine the leaves of their host plant.

References

Moths described in 2003
Endemic fauna of Japan
Tischeriidae
Moths of Japan